Elm mottle virus (EMoV) is a species of plant pathogenic virus in the family Bromoviridae.

External links
 
 ICTVdB - The Universal Virus Database: Elm mottle virus
 Family Groups - The Baltimore Method

Viral plant pathogens and diseases
Bromoviridae